Abdalá Jaime Bucaram Ortiz (born 20 February 1952) is an Ecuadorian politician and lawyer who was President of Ecuador from 10 August 1996 to 6 February 1997. As President, Abdalá Bucaram was nicknamed "El Loco Que Ama" ("The Madman Lover", a nickname he himself championed) and was removed from office after being declared mentally unfit to rule by the National Congress of Ecuador on 12 February 1997. He lived in exile in Panama under political asylum laws, then returned to Ecuador in 2017 when the charges against him expired.

Family political background
Born in Guayaquil, Bucaram is the son of Jacobo Bucaram Elmhalin (1920–1967), the son of Lebanese immigrants, and Rina Ortiz Caicedo (1926-1982). He grew up playing football in the streets of Guayaquil and later went on to become a successful athlete and earn a degree in physical education. He was also a hurdler. He was the flag bearer for Ecuador at the 1972 Summer Olympics but did not compete in the Games due to injury. He was the police chief of Guayas and the president of Barcelona Sporting Club, a football team from his hometown. While being a gym teacher, he earned a degree in law and soon began his political career. He used to live in Kennedy Norte, a neighborhood next to the José Joaquín de Olmedo International Airport, before he left to Panama after the deposition of his government.

Bucaram was the nephew of the politician Assad Bucaram, who was mayor of Guayaquil. His sister, Martha Bucaram, was married to former President Jaime Roldós Aguilera, both of whom were killed in a mysterious air crash.

Early political years
He was the Mayor of Guayaquil, and the founder and member of the Ecuadorian Roldosist Party (PRE). He then competed for the presidency of the Republic in 1988 and 1992 before succeeding in the 1996 run.

1996 presidential campaign

Bucaram defeated Social Christian Party (PSC) candidate Jaime Nebot by winning in all but one of the 21 provinces. He was the first elected president to do so.

Time as president

Bucaram was president from 10 August 1996, to 6 February 1997. His cabinet was put together by Vice President Rosalia Arteaga. Within months, Bucaram was accused of embezzling millions of dollars of public funds. He has been called a "messianic personality and unconventional that attracted criticism from his critics and the media" by a Turkish media site.

He was accused of several crimes including stealing from the Central bank and from Customs and mismanaging the COVID-19 pandemic and barred from entering the United States. After he took office, Bucaram tried to reorganize the state which led to a culture of bribery and favoritism.

Impeachment

In February 1997, Bucaram was impeached by the National Congress because of concerns about his capacity to act in the office of presidency.

Life after impeachment
Bucaram received political asylum in Panama after several corruption charges were laid against him. He returned on Saturday, 2 April 2005, after the corruption charges were lifted the previous day. He stayed in Guayaquil for about two and a half weeks. The corruption charges against him were reinstated after Lucio Gutiérrez was forced to leave to avoid the charges.

On December 1, 2014, Bucaram's son Abdalá "Dalo" Bucarám Jr. renounced his seat in the Ecuadorian National Assembly.

On 4 June 2020, Attorney General Diana Salazar Méndez announced that a stock of 5,000 masks and 2,000 COVID-19 tests had been found at Bucaram's residence preventing their use in combatting a large outbreak of the COVID-19 pandemic.

In August 2020, Bucaram was arrested and released at his home in Guayaquil as part of an organized crime investigation. The investigation centered on the murder of an Israeli citizen, Tomer Sheinman (also known as Shy Dahan), a few days earlier in the Guayaquil jail. Bucaram was implicated because an audio conversation between Bucaram and the murdered Sheinman (Dahan) was found. Sheinman (Dahan) was involved in trading medical supplies with Bucaram's son, Jacobo.

On 9 March 2022, the United States announced that Bucaram "due to his involvement in significant corruption, including misappropriation of public funds, accepting bribes, and interfering with public processes" would be barred from entering the country.

References

External links

 Abdalá Bucaram - YouTube
 Caida de Abdala Bucaram 5 de Febrero de 1997
 AUGE Y CAÍDA DE BUCARAM, EN RESUMEN
 CORRUPCIÓN EN ECUADOR: ¡PROHIBIDO OLVIDAR!
Extended biography (in Spanish) by CIDOB Foundation
Official Website of the Ecuadorian Government about the country President's History
Dalo y Gaby Asambleistas, PRE la nueva Era
Biography by CIDOB (in Spanish)

|-

|-

|-

1952 births
Living people
Athletes (track and field) at the 1972 Summer Olympics
Olympic athletes of Ecuador
Mayors of Guayaquil
Presidents of Ecuador
Ecuadorian male hurdlers
Ecuadorian police chiefs
Ecuadorian sportsperson-politicians
Leaders ousted by a coup
20th-century Ecuadorian lawyers
Ecuadorian people of Lebanese descent
Ecuadorian people of Spanish descent
Sportspeople from Guayaquil
Ecuadorian Roldosist Party politicians